Kalle Östman (born 20 May 1994) is a Swedish professional ice hockey player currently playing for Leksands IF of the Swedish Hockey League (SHL).

Östman first played in the SHL with Djurgårdens IF. Upon two season with Djurgårdens, Östman left as a free agent and signed a two-year contract with the Malmö Redhawks on 21 April 2021.

References

External links

1994 births
Living people
Djurgårdens IF Hockey players
Leksands IF players
Malmö Redhawks players
IK Pantern players
Swedish ice hockey forwards
People from Falun
Sportspeople from Dalarna County